Trichomycterus brachykechenos is a species of pencil catfish endemic to Brazil, where it occurs in the dos Sinos river, part of the Laguna dos Patos system, in the state of Rio Grande do Sul. This species reaches a maximum length of  SL.

Etymology
The specific name brachykechenos is derived from the Greek brachys (βραχύς), meaning short, and kechenos (κεχηνώς), meaning gaping, and refers to the short posterior cranial fontanelle of the species.

Habitat and ecology
At the locality where most of the type specimens were collected, the dos Sinos river is narrow (5 to 9m) and shallow (depth less than 1m) with fast current and rapids, a distinct slope, clear waters, a substrate consisting mainly of large rocks, and conserved riparian vegetation.

T. brachykechenos feeds on  larvae of the Chironomidae (Diptera) and pupa of the Diptera.

References

Further reading

External links

brachykechenos
Fish of South America
Fish of Brazil
Endemic fauna of Brazil
Fish described in 2013